Diakou (Greek: Διάκου) is a neighbourhood in the city of Patras. The area was known as Selachagia (Σελαχαγιά) during the Ottoman era from one of the Turkish landowners with that name.

It was named Diakou (deacon's), after the Greek independence, by a priest (Cyrillos Giannakopoulos), also landowner in the area.

References
Istorikon Letikon ton Patron (Ιστορικόν Λεξικόν των Πατρών = Patras Historic Dictionary) Kostas N. Triantafyllou, pg. 507
The first version of the article is translated from the article at the Greek Wikipedia (el:Main Page)

Neighborhoods in Patras